"The Prayer" is a song by English rock band Bloc Party. It was released as the lead single from their second studio album, A Weekend in the City, except in the U.S. where it is the second single. "I Still Remember" was the first song from the album to be released in North America. It was released by Wichita Recordings on 29 January 2007 and is the band's highest charting single worldwide. The lyrics deal with drug use in nightclubs and party environments. Band frontman Kele Okereke says he was inspired to write the song after hearing Busta Rhymes' song "Touch It". He also described the song as having a "crunk-like" effect. A cover version of "The Prayer" by KT Tunstall is included in Radio 1's Live Lounge – Volume 2, and on her single "If Only".

Lyrics
The lyrics of the song deal with the use of club drugs such as MDMA and Ketamine in nightclubs and parties. The song deals with the effects of such drugs on the human body through the eyes of a user, who asks, "Is it so wrong, to want rewarding?/To want more than is given to you?".

Music video
A video for the song was released on 5 December 2006, and was directed by Walter Stern, also known for directing videos by Massive Attack, The Prodigy and most notably The Verve's "Bitter Sweet Symphony". In the video, all members of Bloc Party are at a nightclub (which, in reality, is Café 1001 in London). It follows them throughout the night even though they do not appear to be doing much. Okereke is the only one who actually gets up and goes around. The other members just sit around while Okereke goes off on his own journey, whilst cigarette burn effects and other visual distortions appear.

In popular culture
The song was featured in the racing video game Project Gotham Racing 4 (also required for the Tonight Make Me Unstoppable achievement, which requires you to finish a race in second place with this song playing.), while the Does It Offend You, Yeah? remix was featured on Need for Speed: ProStreet. The song was also featured in the general trailer of the sixth season of Smallville in March and April 2007. The song was also featured in the soundtrack for the video game NHL 2K8.

Track listing

7" vinyls
 Wichita / WEBB118S (UK) (in gatefold sleeve which houses second 7")

 Wichita / WEBB118SX (UK)

CD
 Wichita / WEBB118SCD (UK)

Remixes

Bonus download track

Charts

References

2007 singles
Bloc Party songs
Song recordings produced by Jacknife Lee
Songs about drugs
Wichita Recordings singles
2007 songs
Songs written by Kele Okereke
Songs written by Gordon Moakes
Songs written by Russell Lissack
Songs written by Matt Tong
Music videos directed by Walter Stern